Statistics of the V-League in the 1995 season.

Standings
Hồ Chí Minh City Police F.C.
Thừa Thiên Huế
Saigon Port
An Giang
Khanh Hoa
Dong Thap
Lam Dong
Song Lam Nghe An  
Thể Công
HCMC Custom (Hải Quan)
Sông Bé
Long An
Binh Dinh
Quang Nam Danang

Final
HCMC Police   7-4 Thua Thien Hue

References
1995 V-League at RSSSF

Vietnamese Super League seasons
Viet
Viet
1